The City of Alachua Downtown Historic District is a U.S. historic district (designated as such on July 14, 2000) located in Alachua, Florida. It contains 102 historic buildings.

References

External links
 Florida's Office of Cultural and Historical Programs - Alachua County
 Historic Markers in Alachua County

National Register of Historic Places in Alachua County, Florida
Historic districts on the National Register of Historic Places in Florida